Clifton Hill is the seventh studio album by Canadian pop metal band Honeymoon Suite, released in late 2008.  It is the band's newest studio album since 2002.

Background and details
After Honeymoon Suite's original lineup (circa 1984) reunited to tour Canada in the summers of 2007 and 2008, they returned to the studio to record a new album with their original producer and current manager, Tom Tremeuth.  The first single released to radio was "Tired O' Waitin' on You".

The album title is an homage to the cluster of tourist attractions on Clifton Hill in the band's hometown of Niagara Falls, Ontario. As guitarist Derry Grehan explained in an interview with The Niagara Falls Review: "I think our best record was The Big Prize, and the new songs were kind of sounding like that. Riffy, simple with big choruses. So with Johnnie and I paying homage to our roots, we thought (for a title) ... 'Lundy's Lane?' No.  Trying to find a name for a record after the fact is hard. At one point Clifton Hill came up. I thought it had a nice feel for an album title. Easy to remember. I can't explain it, it just kind of works."

The photograph used for the album's cover was taken by Russell Harbottle in 1985.

Track listing 
"She Ain't Alright" - 3:50
"Tired O' Waitin' on You"  - 3:02
"Riffola" - 3:53
"Ordinary" - 3:52
"The House" - 4:12
"Why Should I?" - 3:35 
"Down 2 Bizness" - 3:49
"Sunday Morning" - 3:51
"That's All U Got" - 3:36
"Restless" - 3:17
"Separate Lives" - 3:33
"The Garden" - 3:42
All songs written by Johnnie Dee and Derry Grehan.

Album credits

Personnel
Johnnie Dee - lead vocals
Derry Grehan - guitars, background vocals
Ray Coburn - keyboards
Chris McNeill - drums
Stan Mizcek - bass

Production
Tom Treumuth - producer, mixer
Corey Barnes - engineer, mixer
Rob Lamothe - pre-production engineering
Phil Demetro - mastering at The Lacquer Channel
Katie Hildreth - album design (with cdexperts.com)
Deanna Grehan - cover concept

References
 Liner notes from the album.

2008 albums
Honeymoon Suite albums